Greene Township is a township in Iowa County, Iowa, USA.

History
Greene Township was established in 1847. It was named for General Nathanael Greene.

References

Townships in Iowa County, Iowa
Townships in Iowa
1847 establishments in Iowa